A list of  gauge railways in the United States. Apart from historical railways, it is commonly used in underground coal mines.  Also, in the past, this gauge had been a popular choice for urban mass transit systems (see table below).

Railroads

See also

Narrow gauge railroads in the United States
Heritage railway
2 ft gauge railroads in the United States
2 ft 6 in gauge railroads in the United States
3 ft gauge railroads in the United States
Three foot six inch gauge railways in the United Kingdom

References